Cayman may refer to
 Cayman Islands, an overseas territory of the United Kingdom
 Grand Cayman, Cayman Brac, or Little Cayman, three islands that are part of the Cayman Islands
 , a British frigate in service with the Royal Navy from 1944 to 1946
 Porsche Cayman, a sports car produced by Porsche
 AMD Radeon HD6900 GPU series, codenamed Cayman

See also
 Caiman, a small crocodilian of Central and South America
 Caiman (disambiguation)